Awa Chuo Dam is an earthfill dam located in Chiba Prefecture in Japan. The dam is used for irrigation. The catchment area of the dam is 14.9 km2. The dam impounds about 20  ha of land when full and can store 2113 thousand cubic meters of water. The construction of the dam was completed in 1972.

References

Dams in Chiba Prefecture
1972 establishments in Japan